Khreibet Ej Jindi    is a town in Akkar Governorate, Lebanon.

The population  is mostly  Sunni Muslim.

History
In 1838, Eli Smith noted  the village as Khureibet el-Jundy,  located east of esh-Sheikh Mohammed. The  inhabitants were  Sunni Muslims.

In 1856 it was named Khureibet el-Jundy on the map of Northern Palestine/Lebanon that Heinrich Kiepert published that year.

References

Bibliography

External links
Khreibet Ej Jindi, Localiban 

Populated places in Akkar District
Sunni Muslim communities in Lebanon